The SS postcode area, also known as the Southend-on-Sea postcode area, is a group of seventeen postcode districts in England, within eleven post towns. These cover south-east Essex, including Southend-on-Sea, Basildon, Benfleet, Canvey Island, Hockley, Leigh-on-Sea, Rayleigh, Rochford, Stanford-le-Hope, Westcliff-on-Sea and Wickford.



Coverage
The approximate coverage of the postcode districts:

|-
! SS0
| WESTCLIFF-ON-SEA
| Westcliff-on-Sea, Chalkwell
| Southend-on-Sea
|-
! style="background:#FFFFFF;"|SS1
| style="background:#FFFFFF;"|WESTCLIFF-ON-SEA
| style="background:#FFFFFF;"|PO Boxes
| style="background:#FFFFFF;"|non-geographic
|-
! SS1
| SOUTHEND-ON-SEA
| Southend-on-Sea, Thorpe Bay
| Southend-on-Sea
|-
! SS2
| SOUTHEND-ON-SEA
| Southend-on-Sea, Prittlewell, Southchurch, London Southend Airport
| Southend-on-Sea
|-
! SS3
| SOUTHEND-ON-SEA
| Shoeburyness, Great Wakering, Little Wakering, Barling
| Rochford, Southend-on-Sea
|-
! SS4
| ROCHFORD
| Rochford, Ashingdon, Canewdon, Stambridge, Paglesham
| Rochford
|-
! SS5
| HOCKLEY
| Hockley, Hullbridge, Hawkwell
| Rochford
|-
! SS6
| RAYLEIGH
| Rayleigh
| Rochford
|-
! SS7
| BENFLEET
| Hadleigh, South Benfleet, Thundersley
| Castle Point
|-
! SS8
| CANVEY ISLAND
| Canvey Island
| Castle Point
|-
! SS9
| LEIGH-ON-SEA
| Eastwood, Leigh-on-Sea
| Southend-on-Sea
|-
! SS11
| WICKFORD
| Wickford
| Basildon, Chelmsford, Rochford
|-
! SS12
| WICKFORD
| Wickford, North Benfleet
| Basildon
|-
! SS13
| BASILDON
| Pitsea
| Basildon
|-
! SS14
| BASILDON
| Basildon
| Basildon
|-
! SS15
| BASILDON
| Laindon
| Basildon
|-
! SS16
| BASILDON
| Langdon Hills
| Basildon
|-
! SS17
| STANFORD-LE-HOPE
| Stanford-le-Hope, Corringham, Horndon-on-the-Hill
| Thurrock
|-
! style="background:#FFFFFF;"|SS22
| style="background:#FFFFFF;"|SOUTHEND-ON-SEA
| style="background:#FFFFFF;"|International Masters Publishers
| style="background:#FFFFFF;"|non-geographic
|-
! style="background:#FFFFFF;"|SS99
| style="background:#FFFFFF;"|SOUTHEND-ON-SEA
| style="background:#FFFFFF;"|HM Revenue and Customs (VAT), First Data
| style="background:#FFFFFF;"|non-geographic
|}

Map

See also
Postcode Address File
List of postcode areas in the United Kingdom

References

External links
Royal Mail's Postcode Address File
A quick introduction to Royal Mail's Postcode Address File (PAF)

Postcode areas covering the East of England
Borough of Basildon
Southend-on-Sea (district)